Rhinella acutirostris is a species of toad in the family Bufonidae.
It is found in Brazil, Colombia, Panama, and Venezuela.
Its natural habitats are subtropical or tropical moist lowland forests, freshwater marshes, and intermittent freshwater marshes.

References

External links 
 Rhinella acutirostris, ASW 5.6/AMNH
 Rhinella acutirostris, Animal Diversity
 
 

acutirostris
Amphibians of Brazil
Amphibians of Colombia
Amphibians of Panama
Amphibians of Venezuela
Amphibians described in 1824
Taxonomy articles created by Polbot